This is a list of wineries in Missouri. German immigrants in the early-to-mid-19th century founded the wine industry in Missouri, resulting in its wine corridor being called the Missouri "Rhineland". Later Italian immigrants also entered wine production. In the mid-1880s, more wine was produced by volume in Missouri than in any other state. Before prohibition, Missouri was the second-largest wine-producing state in the nation. Missouri had the first area recognized as a federally designated American Viticultural Area with  the Augusta AVA acknowledged on June 20, 1980.  There are now four AVAs in Missouri. In 2021 there were over 130 wineries operating in the state of Missouri, up from 92 in 2009.


See also

 Missouri wine

References

Citations

Works cited

Further reading
 
 

 

Missouri
Wineries
Missouri